Unorganized West Timiskaming District is an unorganized area in the Canadian province of Ontario, comprising almost all portions of the Timiskaming District which are not organized into incorporated municipalities.

The division encompasses 10,239.58 square kilometres, and had a population of 3,257 in the Canada 2016 Census.

Communities
Communities in the division include Boston Creek, Dane, Gowganda, Kenabeek, Kenogami Lake, King Kirkland, Lorrain Valley, Marshall's Corners, Mowat Landing, Paradis Bay, Savard, Sesekinika, Tarzwell and Tomstown.

Demographics

Population trend:
 Population in 2016: 3257
 Population in 2011: 2925
 Population in 2006: 3310
 Population in 2001: 3275 (or 3270 when adjusted for 2006 boundaries)
 Population in 1996: 3541 (or 3506 when adjusted for 2001 boundaries)
 Population in 1991: 3499

Mother tongue(includes multiple answers):
 English as first language: 79.6%
 French as first language: 14.7%
 Other as first language: 5.1%

See also
List of townships in Ontario

References

Geography of Timiskaming District
Timiskaming West